"New Girl Now" is a song by the Canadian rock band Honeymoon Suite. It was written by Derry Grehan, and released as a single in 1984, from the album Honeymoon Suite. The single reached No. 23 in Canada and No. 57 in the United States.

The song is played in the episode of The Kids in the Hall: Death Comes to Town "The Stages of Grief" during the bar scene where Death is trying to order a drink. It also features in the Bones episode "The Woman in Limbo". Also played in the Miami Vice episode "One Eyed Jack".

The song is part of the opening scene in the 2008 horror film Gutterballs.

In 2015 Grehan received a SOCAN Classic Award based on the song having been played more than 100,000 times on Canadian radio.

Background

Derry Grahan said he had just ended a relationship and moved to college, so the song was partly based on fact.

References

1984 debut singles
1984 songs
Honeymoon Suite songs
Warner Music Group singles